Mikhail Aleksandrovich Ryzhov (born 16 April 1981) is a former Russian professional football player.

Club career
He made his Russian Football National League debut for FC Arsenal Tula on 19 June 2001 in a game against FC Lokomotiv Chita.

External links
 

1981 births
People from Arzamas
Living people
Russian footballers
Association football defenders
Association football midfielders
FC Oryol players
FC Torpedo NN Nizhny Novgorod players
FC Arsenal Tula players
FC Khimik-Arsenal players
FC Spartak Kostroma players
Sportspeople from Nizhny Novgorod Oblast